Umanakaina, or Gwedena, is a Papuan language of New Guinea. It is a rather divergent member of the Dagan family.

Bibliography
Word lists
Anonymous. 1914. Vocabularies of languages spoken by the people of the Gwoiru mountains, and the Kanamara people on the main range and from Paiwa, Goodenough Bay, N. E. D. Papua Annual Report 1913–1914: 184–184.
Ray, Sidney H. 1938. The languages of the Eastern and South-Eastern Division of Papua. Journal of the Royal Anthropological Institute of Great Britain and Ireland 68: 153–208. (Also includes word lists of Dima and other languages)

References

External links 
 Paradisec has a collection of materials from Tom Dutton (TD1) that include Umanakaina language materials.

Languages of Milne Bay Province
Dagan languages